Natalia Cigliuti (born September 6, 1978) is a Uruguayan-American actress, best known for her roles as Lindsay Warner on Saved by the Bell: The New Class and as Anita Santos Warner on All My Children.

Career
Cigliuti was born in Montevideo, Uruguay. She spent her childhood years in South America until her family moved to New York. She started her acting career at the age of 14 after a local talent agency discovered her at a fashion show. At the age of 15, Cigliuti landed her first series, playing the role of Lindsay Warner on Saved by the Bell: The New Class. This led to other television work, including a starring role on Pacific Palisades, Beverly Hills, 90210, Odd Man Out, The Random Years and numerous guest star appearances on programs such as CSI.

Cigliuti joined the cast of the All My Children in February 2004, playing the role of Anita Santos. In March 2006, she was let go from AMC after only two years due to declining story lines. She was taken off the show officially on April 12. Cigliuti appeared in the TNT series Raising the Bar as Roberta "Bobbi" Gilardi. She had a recurring role as Detective Sam Harper on the A&E's The Glades in 2011.

Personal life
Cigliuti married Rob Rizzo in 2004 but by 2013 they had divorced. They have a son. She married actor Matt Passmore on January 3, 2016.

Filmography

Film

Television

Video Games

References

External links

Interview at Talk Humor

Living people
1978 births
Actresses from Montevideo
21st-century American actresses
American child actresses
American voice actresses
American film actresses
American soap opera actresses
American television actresses
Hispanic and Latino American actresses
Uruguayan emigrants to the United States
20th-century American actresses